Rhythm Plate are predominantly a deep house production duo who formed in 1995. They consist of Matt 'Rhythm' and Ant 'Plate', who have infrequently DJed across the UK (Egg, Fabric), even less so, Europe (SONAR 2009 & 2010, Cork, Montpellier) and once around the world (San Francisco, Auckland, Brisbane, Thailand). In 2012, they played their first live gig at Fabric using extensive outboard gear; including a Roland Juno 60, a Minimoog Model D, a Korg DW-8000, various effects and mixers and two Yamaha samplers. In 2013, Rhythm Plate started a new 'vinyl only' record label called Pressed For Time Records which, despite its lack of paid publicity/PR machine interest, each of the releases have been well received by the deep/tech house community of DJs It still releases music today.

Rhythm Plate released their first, and only, studio album Off The Charts in September 2013. This saw them collaborate with several vocalists including Frank H Carter III, Clive Astin, Colin Mutchler, Mykle Anthony (14 Karat Soul), Lorna Bean (Sean Bean) and actor Johnny Ray Gill, as well working with as notable musicians, Matt Chandler (jazz guitar), Gary Reader (saxophone) and Richard Heacock (strings).

They have written incidental music that has been featured on several UK and US television shows, most notably CSI: Miami. They have also remixed other artists including Mark Ronson, The Frames, Amp Fiddler, Martin Iveson, Inland Knights and had tracks featured on music compilations released by Renaissance, Global Underground and Hed Kandi amongst others.

Discography

Singles and EPs

Remixes

References

External links 
 
 
 InternationalDJ Magagzine interview with Rhythm Plate
 Fabric interview with Rhythm Plate
 LeftLion Magazine interview with Rhythm Plate

Nu-disco musicians
English house music duos